The Return of Captain Invincible is a 1983 Australian superhero musical comedy film directed by Philippe Mora, and starring Alan Arkin and Christopher Lee. It was a box office disappointment on release but has become a cult film since then.

Plot
The plot involves the super-hero called "Captain Invincible" (also known as "Legend in Leotards", "The Caped Contender" and "Man of Magnet") who is active during Prohibition, World War II, and afterwards. Once a popular hero to all Americans, he is forced into retirement by McCarthy-style government persecution in the 1950s.

A congressional investigation accuses him of being a communist, citing his red cape and "premature anti-fascism". He is charged with violating U.S. airspace by flying without a proper license, impersonating a military officer, and wearing underwear in public. He disappears from the public eye, moving to Australia and becoming an alcoholic.

Thirty years later, his old nemesis, the super-villain "Mr. Midnight", re-emerges and steals a secret government super-weapon: the hypno-ray. The US government asks Captain Invincible to return, and the story follows his attempts to return to super-heroing and redeem his reputation.

Cast
 Alan Arkin as Captain Invincible, US superhero who fought for the allies during WWII, but fell on hard times.
 Christopher Lee as Mr. Midnight, Invincible's nemesis; dedicated to evil, his latest plan involves the eradication of the ethnic minorities in New York.
 Kate Fitzpatrick as Patty Patria, Australian policewoman who helps Invincible get back to his former glory.
 Bill Hunter as Tupper / Coach
 Michael Pate as The US president, who as a child met Invincible. The meeting left an impression on him.
 Doug McGrath as Adolf Hitler
 Graham Kennedy as Prime Minister
 Max Phipps as Admiral
 Alfred Sandor as New York Police Captain
 Ron Becks as Black Salesman
 Garth Meade as Polish Salesman

Production
The Return of Captain Invincible was directed by Philippe Mora. It was produced by Seven Keys Production and Willara and distributed by Seven Keys in Australia. It was scheduled for release in the US by Jensen Farley Pictures, but the company went out of business days before the scheduled national opening; it was later offered on American VHS and laserdisc by Magnum Entertainment. A widescreen DVD later followed from Elite Entertainment Inc. It was filmed in Australia.

Lyricist Richard O'Brien and composer Richard Hartley, known for their prior collaboration on The Rocky Horror Show and The Rocky Horror Picture Show, contributed three songs, including "Captain Invincible" sung by O'Brien, "Evil Midnight" sung by Lee and Arkin, and "Name Your Poison" sung by Lee during which the evil Mr. Midnight tempts the alcoholic Captain Invincible with a well-stocked bar.

After the film was completed, producer Andrew Gaty, acting on the advice of his American distributor, recut. Mora objected and the matter wound up before the Minister of Home Affairs, Tom McVeigh. McVeigh declared that the film was not "Australian" and thus did not qualify for the 150% tax deduction available for investors. Gaty challenged this decision in court and won.

Music

Reception
The Return of Captain Invincible grossed a mere $55,110 at the Australian box office against a budget of $7 million.

British fantasy novelist Terry Pratchett called the film "a series of bad moments pasted together with great songs and a budget of fourpence," but said that he had watched it a number of times. Colin Greenland reviewed The Return of Captain Invincible for Imagine magazine, and stated that "Featuring hilarious musical routines from the man who wrote The Rocky Horror Picture Show and tongue-in-cheek aerobatics by the effects team from Superman, this eccentric, extraordinary and utterly delightful Australian movie has been unforgiveably denied to British audiences until now. All credit to Entertainment in Video for discovering it."

Accolades

References

External links 
 
 
The Return of Captain Invincible at Rocky Music
The Return of Captain Invincible at Oz Movies

1983 films
Australian fantasy comedy films
1980s English-language films
1980s musical comedy films
1980s superhero films
Superhero comedy films
Films directed by Philippe Mora
Australian alternative history films
Science fiction musical films
Fantasy music
1983 comedy films
Films with screenplays by Steven E. de Souza